Nonsyndromic deafness is hearing loss that is not associated with other signs and symptoms. In contrast, syndromic deafness involves hearing loss that occurs with abnormalities in other parts of the body. Genetic changes are related to the following types of nonsyndromic deafness.
 DFNA: nonsyndromic deafness, autosomal dominant
 DFNB: nonsyndromic deafness, autosomal recessive
 DFNX: nonsyndromic deafness, X-linked
 nonsyndromic deafness, mitochondrial

Each type is numbered in the order in which it was described. For example, DFNA1 was the first described autosomal dominant type of nonsyndromic deafness. Mitochondrial nonsyndromic deafness involves changes to the small amount of DNA found in mitochondria, the energy-producing centers within cells.

Most forms of nonsyndromic deafness are associated with permanent hearing loss caused by damage to structures in the inner ear. The inner ear consists of three parts: a snail-shaped structure called the cochlea that helps process sound, nerves that send information from the cochlea to the brain, and structures involved with balance. Loss of hearing caused by changes in the inner ear is called sensorineural deafness. Hearing loss that results from changes in the middle ear is called conductive hearing loss. The middle ear contains three tiny bones that help transfer sound from the eardrum to the inner ear. Some forms of nonsyndromic deafness involve changes in both the inner ear and the middle ear; this combination is called mixed hearing loss.

The severity of hearing loss varies and can change over time. It can affect one ear (unilateral) or both ears (bilateral). Degrees of hearing loss range from mild (difficulty understanding soft speech) to profound (inability to hear even very loud noises). The loss may be stable, or it may progress as a person gets older. Particular types of nonsyndromic deafness often show distinctive patterns of hearing loss. For example, the loss may be more pronounced at high, middle, or low tones.

Classification
Nonsyndromic deafness can occur at any age. Hearing loss that is present before a child learns to speak is classified as prelingual or congenital. Hearing loss that occurs after the development of speech is classified as postlingual.

Genetics
Nonsyndromic deafness can have different patterns of inheritance. Between 75% and 80% of cases are inherited in an autosomal recessive pattern, which means two copies of the gene in each cell are altered. Usually, each parent of an individual with autosomal recessive deafness is a carrier of one copy of the altered gene. These carriers do not have hearing loss.

Another 20% to 25% of nonsyndromic deafness cases are autosomal dominant, which means one copy of the altered gene in each cell is sufficient to result in hearing loss. People with autosomal dominant deafness most often inherit an altered copy of the gene from a parent who has hearing loss.

Between 1% and 2% of cases show an X-linked pattern of inheritance, which means the mutated gene responsible for the condition is located on the X chromosome. Males with X-linked nonsyndromic deafness tend to develop more severe hearing loss earlier in life than females who inherit a copy of the same gene mutation. Fathers will not pass X-linked traits to their sons since they do not pass on the X chromosome to their male offspring.

Mitochondrial nonsyndromic deafness, which results from changes to the DNA in mitochondria, occurs in fewer than 1% of cases in the United States. The altered mitochondrial DNA is passed from a mother to her sons and daughters. This type of deafness is not inherited from fathers.

Late onset progressive deafness is the most common neurological disability of the elderly. Although hearing loss of greater than 25 decibels is present in only 1% of young adults between the ages of 18–24 years of age, this increases to 10% in persons between 55 and 64 years of age and approximately 50% in octogenarians.

The relative contribution of heredity to age-related hearing impairment is not known, however the majority of inherited late-onset deafness is autosomal dominant and non-syndromic (Van Camp et al., 1997). Over forty genes associated with autosomal dominant non-syndromic hearing loss have been localized and of these fifteen have been cloned.

Genes related to nonsyndromic deafness
Mutations in the ACTG1, CABP2, CDH23, CLDN14, COCH, COL11A2, DFNA5, ESPN, EYA4, GJB2, GJB6, KCNQ4, MYO15A, MYO6, MYO7A, OTOF, PCDH15, POU3F4, SLC26A4, STRC, TECTA, TMC1, TMIE, TMPRSS3, USH1C, and WFS1 genes cause nonsyndromic deafness, with weaker evidence currently implicating genes CCDC50, DIAPH1, DSPP, ESRRB, GJB3, GRHL2, GRXCR1, HGF, LHFPL5, LOXHD1, LRTOMT, MARVELD2, MIR96, MYH14, MYH9, MYO1A, MYO3A, OTOA, PJVK, POU4F3, PRPS1, PTPRQ, RDX, SERPINB6, SIX1, SLC17A8, TPRN, TRIOBP, SLC26A5, and WHRN.

The causes of nonsyndromic deafness can be complex.  Researchers have identified more than 30 genes that, when mutated, may cause nonsyndromic deafness; however, some of these genes have not been fully characterized.  Many genes related to deafness are involved in the development and function of the inner ear.  Gene mutations interfere with critical steps in processing sound, resulting in hearing loss.  Different mutations in the same gene can cause different types of hearing loss, and some genes are associated with both syndromic and nonsyndromic deafness.  In many families, the gene(s) involved have yet to be identified.

Deafness can also result from environmental factors or a combination of genetic and environmental factors, including certain medications, peri-natal infections (infections occurring before or after birth), and exposure to loud noise over an extended period.

Types include:

Diagnosis

Treatment
Treatment is supportive and consists of management of manifestations. Use of hearing aids and/or cochlear implant, suitable educational programs can be offered. Periodic surveillance is also important.

Epidemiology
About 1 in 1,000 children in the United States is born with profound deafness. By age 9, about 3 in 1,000 children have hearing loss that affects the activities of daily living. More than half of these cases are caused by genetic factors. Most cases of genetic deafness (70% to 80%) are nonsyndromic; the remaining cases are caused by specific genetic syndromes. In adults, the chance of developing hearing loss increases with age; hearing loss affects half of all people older than 80 years.

References

Further reading

  In 
  In 
  In 
  In 
  In

External links 

Channelopathies
Mitochondrial diseases
Deafness